Quadroppiidae is a family of mites belonging to the order Sarcoptiformes.

Genera:
 Borhidia Balogh & Mahunka, 1974
 Coronoquadroppia Ohkubo, 1995
 Hexoppia Balogh, 1958
 Quadroppia Jacot, 1939

References

Sarcoptiformes